Greensburg Downtown Historic District or Downtown Greensburg Historic District may refer to:

Greensburg Downtown Historic District (Greensburg, Indiana)
Downtown Greensburg Historic District (Greensburg, Kentucky)
Greensburg Downtown Historic District (Greensburg, Pennsylvania)